Port Adelaide Soccer (Football) Club, also known as The Pirates, is an Australian semi-professional soccer club based in Port Adelaide, South Australia, with their home ground at Ngarrpadla (Aunty) Josie Agius Reserve (formerly known as Taperoo Reserve) in Taperoo. They compete in the South Australian National Premier Leagues State League 1, and also field women's and  collegiate teams.

History
The club was founded in 1903 under the name of Port Adelaide British Football Club. They entered the official competition in season 1904.

The founders included F.Salmon, G.Haywood, J.Haywood, EP Rowley, F.Meakin and J.McColl.

The amalgamation of Port Adelaide and the Cheltenham British Football Club was formalised on Friday 26 March 1914 in the Globe Hotel Port Adelaide. There were elements of the Cheltenham Club who did not agree with the merger and they formed another Cheltenham Club for the 1914 season.

The Port Adelaide club's original ground was on a site adjacent to Alberton Oval. In the late 1920s the club moved to a wasteland that became known as John Hart Reserve.

At the end of the 1941 season the club went into recess and did not field a team in the local competition until 1944. This was because the club lost so many members and players to the war effort.

In 1956 the club merged with Port Thistle S.C which had been known as the Port Presbyterian Thistle S.C. Their home ground was Nazar Reserve which was across the road from the Port Adelaide club. The ground was also known as Stevedores Paddock because horses used on the wharves were left in the paddock. The area was notorious for getting flooded every time there was an extra high tide in the Port River.

The club played at John Hart Reserve for over 75 years except for a period in 1955 and 1956 when they moved to Allenby Gardens Reserve while John Hart Reserve was being redeveloped. There was also a period in the late 1960s and early 1970s when the club played its home games at the old ICI Oval at Peterhead while using John Hart Reserve for training and amateur games.

In 1993 the club merged with the Ukrainian Sports Club Lion to form the Port Adelaide Lion Soccer club currently known as the Pirates.

On Tuesday 10 July 2018, life and financial members voted on a motion to change the official name of the club from Port Adelaide Lion Soccer Club Inc. to Port Adelaide Soccer Club Inc. With the move to the brand new facility at Taperoo on the horizon, name simplification was identified as the way to provide clarity of identity to members, external parties as well as current and potential sponsors. A total of 65 votes were received. As per the constitution a two-thirds majority was required in order for the motion to be passed (44 votes). 49 persons voted in favour of the motion and 16 voted against meaning that the motion was passed. The 'Pirates' nickname was not a part of the motion and remains the moniker of the Club. In a statement from Club officials, the part that the USC Lion name and its people has played in the history of the Club was acknowledged and concluded by stating that "While the Lion name has been removed, the history will never be erased nor the efforts of all parties to keep the club alive be forgotten".

On 4 August 2018 after drawing 1–1 against Western Strikers, they finished 11th in the 2018 State League 1 season relegating them to State League 2. In September 2018, the Club moved to brand new purpose built facility named Taperoo Reserve in Taperoo. The first event was the Seniors Presentation Night held on Saturday 1 September. On Saturday 8 September at the new facility, The Club's Collegiate team secured promotion from Division 3 to Division 2 in their very season participating in the South Australian Collegiate Soccer League. On Sunday 9 September, an official club open day was held that saw the majority of MiniRoos and Juniors sides play a competitive fixture at Taperoo for the very first time.

The Senior team finished 3rd at the conclusion of the 2019 State League 2 season, however failed to secure promotion back to State League 1 via the Finals Series, losing their Elimination Final match against Adelaide Cobras at Taperoo Reserve on penalties following a 2–2 draw. The Club was named Football SA 2019 Club of the Year. The COVID-19 impacted 2020 State League 2 season ended in similar heartbreak for the Senior team. After finishing in 4th place at the end of the regular season, they lost their home Elimination Final against Adelaide University by 2 goals 1 after initially leading the game. However, 2020 was a positive year at Junior level with the U14 side winning the Championship and the U16's finishing in 2nd place in their respective JPL C competitions. 2020 also saw the rebirth of female football at the Pirates, with the Club fielding a team in the U15 Girls competition.

2021 brought about a coaching change with Ryan Mogg joining as Head Coach and Lewis Vallelonga taking on the role of Senior Assistant Coach and Technical Director. Their first season in charge brought immediate success as the Senior team secured the State League 2 Premiership on the last day of the season with a dramatic 4–1 victory over Gawler Eagles, the win was enough to leapfrog Adelaide University, who held the advantage going into the final round, as they were held to a 1–1 draw by Seaford Rangers. This first place finish also guaranteed promotion to State League 1 for the 2022 season.

Club honours

As Port Adelaide
 1st Division Champions: 1911, 1912, 1926, 1927, 1931, 1934 (Pt.Thistle) & 1937 (Pt.Thistle)
 2nd Division Champions: 1939, 1948 (Pt.Thistle), 1956, 1969, 1979 & 1988
 Federation Cup Winners: 1926, 1933, 1934 (Pt.Thistle), 1945 & 1979

As USC Lion
 1st Division Champions: 1965
 2nd Division Champions: 1954 & 1964
 Federation Cup Winners: 1956 & 1961

As Port Adelaide Lion/Port Adelaide Pirates
 Premier League Premiers: 1994 & 1999
 NPL State League Champions: 2014
 Football SA Club of Year: 2019
 State League 2 Premiers: 2021

Notable players 
 Dianne Alagich
 Richie Alagich
 Charles Perkins
 John Kundereri Moriarty
 Dario Vidošić
 Derek Acorah

References

External links 
 Official site

Soccer clubs in Adelaide
Association football clubs established in 1903
1903 establishments in Australia